The Kamakhya–Shri Mata Vaishno Devi Katra Express is an Superfast Express train belonging to Northeast Frontier Railway zone that runs between   and  in India. It is currently being operated with 15655/15656 train numbers on a weekly basis. It is 1 of the three trains connecting Guwahati and Jammu Tawi, the other being Lohit Express and Amarnath Express.

Service

The 15655/Kamakhya–Shri Mata Vaishno Devi Katra Express has an average speed of 48 km/hr and covers 2559 km in 53h 15m. The 15656/Shri Mata Vaishno Devi Katra–Kamakhya Express has an average speed of 45 km/hr and covers 2559 km in 56h 50m.

Route and halts 

The important halts of the train are:

Schedule

Coach composition

The train has standard LHB rakes with max speed of 130 kmph. The train consists of 18 coaches:

 1 AC II Tier
 3 AC III Tier
 6 Sleeper coaches
 6 General Unreserved
 2 End-on Generator

Traction

Both trains are hauled by a Siliguri Loco Shed-based WDP 4/ WDP 4B/ WDP 4D diesel locomotive from Kamakhya to New Coochbehar. From New Coochbehar the train is hauled by a Ghaziabad Loco Shed-based WAP-7 electric locomotive up till Katra, and vice versa.

See also 

 Shri Mata Vaishno Devi Katra railway station
 Kamakhya Junction railway station
 Indore–Guwahati Weekly Express

Notes

References

External links 

 15655/Kamakhya - Shri Mata Vaishno Devi Katra Express India Rail Info
 15656/Shri Mata Vaishno Devi Katra - Kamakhya Express India Rail Info

Transport in Katra, Jammu and Kashmir
Transport in Guwahati
Express trains in India
Rail transport in Jammu and Kashmir
Rail transport in Punjab, India
Rail transport in Haryana
Rail transport in Uttarakhand
Rail transport in Uttar Pradesh
Rail transport in Bihar
Rail transport in West Bengal
Rail transport in Assam
Railway services introduced in 2016